Yugoslavia was a country in Southeast and Central Europe for most of the 20th century.
 Kingdom of Yugoslavia, during 1918–1941
 Democratic Federal Yugoslavia, during 1943–1945
 Socialist Federal Republic of Yugoslavia, during 1945–1992
 Federal Republic of Yugoslavia, 1992–2003, renamed to Serbia and Montenegro in 2003–2006

Yugoslavia (or Jugoslavija) may also refer to:
 1554 Yugoslavia, designation for a stony asteroid in the middle region of the Asteroid Belt
 Jugoslavija (magazine)
 SK Jugoslavija
 Ships named Jugoslavija:
 SMS Viribus Unitis
 SS Cattaro (1920)

See also
 Yugoslav (disambiguation)
 Yugoslavs (disambiguation)
 Demographics of Yugoslavia (disambiguation)
 Yugoslavs (disambiguation)
 Yugoslavism
 South Slavs